Mark Salas (born July 30, 1999) is an American soccer player.

Playing career

Youth
Salas joined the FC Dallas academy in 2005, when he was just six-years old. He remained with the club for 12 years, helping the side to become the 2016 USSDA U-16 National Champions, and the 2015 U-15 National Champions.

College
Salas played college soccer for the North Carolina Tar Heels. Over four seasons with the Tar Heels, including the extended 2020–21 season due to the COVID-19 pandemic, Salas made 73 appearances, where he tallied two assists.

NPSL
In 2019, Salas played with NPSL side Denton Diablos FC, making four appearances for the club.

Professional
On January 21, 2021, Salas was selected 76th overall in the 2021 MLS SuperDraft by FC Dallas. He went to complete his senior season at North Carolina, before signing with Dallas' USL League One affiliate side North Texas SC on July 9, 2021.

Salas made his professional debut on July 17, 2021, appearing as an 89th-minute substitute during a 1–1 draw with Chattanooga Red Wolves.

References 

1999 births
American soccer players
Association football defenders
FC Dallas draft picks
Living people
National Premier Soccer League players
North Carolina Tar Heels men's soccer players
North Texas SC players
Soccer players from Dallas
USL League One players